The Seegrotte, near Hinterbrühl, Austria, is a cave system with a large grotto located under a former gypsum mine.

It was closed in 1912 after the mine flooded with 20 million litres of water. It became a tourist attraction after 1930 and has been one ever since, with the exception of World War II. The lake is 60 meters below ground, the water surface is 6200 m² and pumps are used to keep the water level down.

Visitors can tour the old mine and take a boat ride across the underground lake.

World War II history
During World War II the Seegrotte was used for production of Heinkel He 162A jet fighters in Nazi Germany's "second Ruhr".

References

External links

Seegrotte official website
 Airplane factory Seegrotte - Languste

Nazi subterranea
Mines in Austria
Caves of Austria
Museums in Lower Austria
Mining museums in Austria
Show caves in Austria
Geography of Lower Austria
Landforms of Lower Austria
Show mines